is a public university in Fukuchiyama, Kyoto, Japan.

The University of Fukuchiyama is a part of the Seibi Gakuen school system, which also includes Seibi High School, and Seibi Junior College. The university offers regional management and informatics.

History
The school's predecessor, was founded in 1871 as a private school in Fukuchiyama, Kyoto. It was chartered as a junior college in 1950, and as a four-year university in 2000, then renamed Seibi University in 2010. In 2016, it became a public university and was renamed the University of Fukuchiyama.

External links
  

Educational institutions established in 1871
Public universities in Japan
Universities and colleges in Kyoto Prefecture
1871 establishments in Japan
Fukuchiyama, Kyoto